The Collins–Robinson House is a historic residence in Mobile, Alabama.  It was built in 1843 in a Creole cottage style.  It was placed on the National Register of Historic Places on October 18, 1984, as a part of the 19th Century Spring Hill Neighborhood Thematic Resource.

References

Houses completed in 1843
National Register of Historic Places in Mobile, Alabama
Houses on the National Register of Historic Places in Alabama
Houses in Mobile, Alabama
Creole cottage architecture in Alabama
1843 establishments in Alabama